Janus is the surname of:
 Ed Janus (born 1945), American baseball and beer promoter
 Goran Janus (born 1970), Yugoslav and Slovenian ski jumper
 Jadwiga Janus (1931–2019), Polish sculptor
 Jill Janus (1975–2018), American heavy metal singer
 Joseph Janus (born 1969), American advertising executive and businessman
 Krzysztof Janus (born 1986), Polish footballer
 Marjan Janus (born 1952), Dutch swimmer
 Mark Janus, American plaintiff
 Martin Janus (1620–1682), German church musician, minister, hymn-writer
 Michael Janus, American politician
 Miroslav Januš (born 1972), Czech sport shooter
 Patricia Janus (1932–2006), American poet, artist, and educator
 Paul Janus (born 1975), American football player
 Samantha Janus (born 1972), English actress
 Samuel Janus (born 1930), American psychotherapist
 Stefan Janus (1910–1978), Polish flying ace
 Tim Janus (born 1976), American competitive eater